The Ingolstadt-Treuchtlingen Railway, also known as the Altmühlbahn (Altmühl Railway) is a railway line in the German state of Bavaria. The two-track line carries local services and freight from Ingolstadt through the Altmühl valley to Treuchtlingen.

History
The history of the Altmühl Railway starts in 1833, when the former politician and economist Friedrich List unveiled his plans for a Germany-wide railway network. Even then he envisaged a direct connection from Munich via Ingolstadt to Nuremberg.

During the next 25 years, these plans were considered by the council of the town of Eichstätt, in particular by Mayor Fehlner. They promised economic recovery mainly due to increased freight traffic, in particular from the quarries at Solnhofen and Eichstätt and the local steelworks. Therefore, Eichstätt, along with the other communities and businesses along the proposed route, established a committee to build the Altmühl railway, which made representations on several occasions to King Ludwig I.

Only when the town of Ansbach financed a railway from Ansbach to Gunzenhausen, where it connected to the Ludwig South-North Railway between Lindau and Nuremberg, did the committee succeed. The issue at this time was how to connect the line to Eichstätt—which was eventually linked by a branch line—and how to connect the line to Pleinfeld and Gunzenhausen. The Royal Chief Engineer (königlich functionierende Oberingenieur) Balbier examined several different lines, and finally decided to follow largely the valley of the Altmühl with separate routes from Treuchtlingen to Gunzenhausen and Pleinfeld. On 24 September 1863, the Bavarian parliament approved this plan and on 5 October 1863 King Maximilian II finally signed a law to build the line from Ingolstadt to Gunzenhausen and Pleinfeld.

Construction began officially on 11 November 1867 and it was officially opened on 12 April 1870 by the Royal Bavarian State Railways (Königliche Bayerische Staats-Eisenbahnen). The line was initially built as a single track, but with increasing traffic duplication of the line was completed in 1891. After completion of electrification on the Nuremberg–Augsburg line in 1935, it was decided to also electrify the Altmühl Railway to Munich. Because of the Second World War, the only part completed was the Munich–Dachau section. After the war Deutsche Bundesbahn considered that electrification of the Passau–Nuremberg–Frankfurt had higher priority, which meant that electrification of the Altmühl line was not completed until the early 1960s. Electrical services commenced with the commencement of  the summer timetable on 27 May 1962.

Modernisation of the line commenced in 2002. By 2005 some €50 million had been invested in the project.

Route

From Ingolstadt the line runs mostly north-westerly towards Eichstätt Bahnhof (station). Eichstätt Bahnhof is located on the edge of the Eichstätt district of Wasserzell. A 5.1 km long remnant of the non-electrified Eichstätt–Beilngries line connects as a branch line from Eichstätt Stadt (town) station to the main line. From Eichstätt Bahnhof the line runs largely in the narrow Altmühl valley and as a result it is very curvy. Between Eichstätt Bahnhof and Dollnstein there are two bends that make almost 180° turns. In order to avoid unnecessary bridges over the Altmühl the river was diverted or cuttings were blown through the rocks. Two tunnels, Kirchberg tunnel near Zimmern and Esslingerberg tunnel near Esslingen, and a cutting through a spur of the Perlachberge range near Treuchtlingen cut through loops of the Altmühl. Just before Treuchtlingen station the line also crosses a plate girder bridge over the Möhrenbach, which is similar in design and size to the many bridges over the Altmühl.

Stations
Treuchtlingen station is at the junction of the Treuchtlingen–Würzburg, the Treuchtlingen–Ingolstadt–Munich and the Nuremberg–Augsburg lines. It was established in 1869 in its current form. In addition, it formerly had a depot with 20 tracks, which are now partly dismantled.

Pappenheim station has existed since the opening of the line in 1870.

Solnhofen station was established with the opening of the line in 1870. It has two main platform tracks and through track for non-stopping traffic.

Infrastructure
The course is designed to permit speeds of 110–160 km/h. The superstructure is built with a conventional ballasted track with both wooden and concrete sleepers. An exception is in the Esslingerberg tunnel, which was completely refurbished up until early 2006 for €19 million including the installation of slab track.

Rail services 

The line has an hourly Regionalbahn service on the Munich–Ingolstadt–Treuchtlingen route, which is extended to Nuremberg at two-hourly intervals. Until 2013, the trains continuing to Nuremberg operated as Regional-Expresses.  Extra Regionalbahn services operate during peak hours between Ingolstadt and Eichstätt. The line was formerly of great importance for long-distance traffic, but since 27 May 2006 all long distance services have run on the Nuremberg–Munich high-speed line. Prior to its discontinuance in December 2010 the line was served by a pair of Eurocity services (EN 482/483) on the Munich–Copenhagen route via Ingolstadt–Treuchtlingen, because the trains did not have the required approvals to operate over the high-speed line. Currently the only long-distance services running over the line are motorail trains and seasonal services.

The line is of great importance for freight transport. It is an important link for north-south traffic for trains running from and to Ingolstadt and for traffic coming from Würzburg or Nuremberg and continuing to Munich.

Notes

External links 
 

Railway lines in Bavaria
Railway lines opened in 1870
1870 establishments in Bavaria
Buildings and structures in Ingolstadt
Buildings and structures in Eichstätt (district)
Buildings and structures in Weißenburg-Gunzenhausen